Sir Robert Williams, 2nd Baronet (ca. 1627–1678), was a politician in Wales.

He was a Member of Parliament for Caernarvonshire, 1656–1658, and for Caernarvon Boroughs in 1659. He was one of the Williams-Bulkeley baronets; he became a baronet in 1663.

References

 
 

1620s births
1678 deaths
Members of the Parliament of England (pre-1707) for constituencies in Wales
Baronets in the Baronetage of England
English MPs 1656–1658
English MPs 1659
Members of Parliament for Caernarfon